1990 spelling reform may refer to:

The Rectifications of 1990, a reform from the Académie française
Portuguese Language Orthographic Agreement of 1990, an international treaty on Portuguese that included spelling reform